is a city located in Saitama Prefecture, Japan.

Geography

Chichibu is in the westernmost part of Saitama. Unlike other parts of the prefecture, it is largely mountainous and the population is concentrated in river terraces along the Arakawa River. It is Saitama's largest municipality in terms of surface area and shares borders with Tokyo, Yamanashi, Nagano and Gunma Prefectures. A large portion of the city belongs to Chichibu-Tama-Kai National Park.

Because the region is not suitable for growing rice, many people have traditionally depended on sericulture farming. Limestone from Mount Bukō, which rises south of the city center, is another major source of income for the region. The city is shifting its focus toward sightseeing, taking advantages of its rich natural environment and relative closeness to the Tokyo metropolitan area. The city is also famous for its brewing industry.

Surrounding municipalities
Saitama Prefecture
 Hannō
 Tokigawa
 Kamikawa
 Ogano
 Minano
 Yokoze
 Higashichichibu
Tokyo Metropolis
 Okutama
Yamanashi Prefecture
 Kōshū
 Yamanashi
 Tabayama
Nagano Prefecture
 Kawakami
Gunma Prefecture
 Fujioka
 Kanna
 Ueno

Climate
Chichibu has a Humid subtropical climate (Köppen Cfa) characterized by warm summers and cool winters with light to no snowfall.  The average annual temperature in Chichibu is 13.2 °C. The average annual rainfall is 1325 mm with September as the wettest month. The temperatures are highest on average in August, at around 25.8 °C, and lowest in January, at around 6.0 °C.

Demographics
Per Japanese census data, the population of Chichibu has decreased gradually over the past 60 years.

History
Chichibu was incorporated as a city on April 1, 1950, although Chichibu Province had already existed since before the Nara period and the region has developed many local traditions. Chichibu Province was incorporated into Musashi Province in the 7th century AD. During premodern times, the town developed as a marketplace of the district as well as the town around Chichibu Shrine. The city's older name, Ōmiya ("big shrine"), was derived from the shrine. Since its incorporation in 1950, the area of the city has grown through a series of mergers, the most recent in 2005.

Timeline 
708: Deposits of copper are discovered in the region and offered to the Imperial Court. The era name Wadō (和銅, meaning "Japanese copper") is proclaimed in recognition of this welcome event in the initial months of Empress Genmei's reign. The copper is used to mint Wadō Kaihō or Wadōkaichin, which are amongst the oldest examples of coinage in Japan.-- see image of Wado Kaichin from Japan Mint Museum
1884: The Chichibu incident: uprising of impoverished peasants under the influence of the Freedom and People's Rights Movement. Seven are sentenced to death and over 4,000 people punished.
1889: Ōmiya Town was founded within Chichibu District, Saitama with the establishment of the municipalities system
1914: The Chichibu Railway opened.
1916: Ōmiya Town was renamed Chichibu Town.
1950: Chichibu was elevated to city status.
1954: Chichibu absorbed the villages of Odamaki, Haraya and Kuna.
1957: Chichibu absorbed the villages of Takashino and Ōta.
1958: Chichibu absorbed the town of Kagemori.
1969: The Seibu Chichibu Line opened.
2005: Chichibu absorbed the town of Yoshida, and the villages of Arakawa and Ōtaki (all from Chichibu District).

Government
Chichibu has a mayor-council form of government with a directly elected mayor and a unicameral city council of 22 members. Chichibu contributes one member to the Saitama Prefectural Assembly. In terms of national politics, the city is part of Saitama 11th district of the lower house of the Diet of Japan.

Economy
The local economy of Chichibu remains based on agricultural and forestry, as well as tourism.

Education
Chichibu has 14 public elementary schools and eight public middle schools operated by the city government, and two public high schools operated by the Saitama Prefectural Board of Education. The prefecture also operates two special education schools for the handicapped.

Transportation

Railway
Two lines serve the city: the Chichibu Main Line and Seibu Chichibu Line. The Chichibu Railway was constructed along the Arakawa River and first opened in 1914. Seibu Railway reached the city in 1969 and considerably reduced the travel time to Tokyo. It takes approximately one and a half hours to travel from Seibu-Chichibu Station to Ikebukuro Station, one of the major train terminals in Tokyo. These lines carry people as well as limestone from Mount Bukō. The two lines were directly connected on April 1, 1989. Chichibu Railway also operated the Mitsumine Ropeway, which carried passengers visiting . The ropeway was taken out of service since May 19, 2006, and was officially abandoned on December 1, 2007.

 Seibu Railway – Seibu Chichibu Line

 Chichibu Railway – Chichibu Main Line
 –  –  –  –  –  –  –  –  –

Highway
Two national roads, Route 140 and 299, serve the city. Route 140 connects the city to its nearest expressway interchange, Hanazono Interchange of the Kan-Etsu Expressway. The city had no road communication to Yamanashi Prefecture due to steep Okuchichibu Mountains, but the opening of the Karisaka Tunnel in 1998 enabled the city to connect to Yamanashi.

Twin towns and sister cities
  Toshima, Tokyo, since October 14, 1983
  Sanyō-Onoda, Yamaguchi, since May 20, 1996
  Antioch, California, United States, since September 16, 1967
  Gangneung, Gangwon-do, South Korea, since February 16, 1983
  Linfen, Shanxi Province, China, since October 7, 1988
  Warringah, Australia, since April 26, 1996
 Yasothon, Yasothon Province, Thailand, since May 6, 1999

Local attractions

On December 3, Chichibu holds an annual night festival (Intangible cultural heritage). It attracts crowds from Chichibu, Saitama prefecture, neighboring Tokyo, and the Kantō region. Kawase matsuri is Chichibu shrine's summer festival. It takes place every July 19 and July 20. Eight groups carrying special dashi floats march along to festival music around the city. Mikoshi (sacred portable shrines) are brought to special places in each neighborhood where they are enshrined. Neighborhood association heads wash the mikoshi in the Arakawa River.

Other attractions of the city include:

Chichibu Muse Park
Chichibu Shrine
Hitsujiyama Park
Okuchichibu Mountains
Lake Chichibu
Mitsumine Shrine
Nakatsugawa Gorge
Chichibu 34 Kannon Pilgrimage

In popular media
As a picturesque area within fairly easy reach of Tokyo, Chichibu has been much photographed. However, the photography of Chichibu by the Chichibu native Bukō Shimizu (1913–1995) is particularly extensive: Shimizu presented photographs of the mountains, people and customs of Chichibu in numerous books for the Japanese market, starting in 1954.

The town of Chichibu is the setting for the popular anime series Anohana: The Flower We Saw That Day and the anime films The Anthem of the Heart and Her Blue Sky, all of which were written by Mari Okada who was born in Chichibu.

Possible connection with The Mikado 
The city considers itself as the inspiration for Gilbert and Sullivan's 1885 comic opera, The Mikado; the name of the opera's setting, "Titipu", is pronounced "Chichipu" in Japanese. Rokusuke Ei, a popular essayist, was convinced that Chichibu, the site of a peasant uprising in 1884, inspired the author, W. S. Gilbert, to set the opera in Japan. Other Japanese researchers have concluded that Gilbert may simply have heard of Chichibu silk, an important export in the 19th century. A theatre company from Chichibu has presented The Mikado in Japanese in Chichibu on March 10, 2001, performed by local actors, and throughout other locations in Japan. In August 2006, it travelled with this production to the International Gilbert and Sullivan Festival in Buxton, England.

Notable people from Chichibu
 Seijuro Arafune, Former Minister of Transport
 Mari Okada, screenwriter and director
Akihito Ozawa, footballer
 Tatsuya Fujiwara, actor
 Wakachichibu Komei, former sumo wrestler
 Arisa Nakajima, professional wrestler
 Bukō Shimizu, photographer
 Akira Taue, professional wrestler

References

Further reading
 Titsingh, Isaac, ed. (1834). [Siyun-sai Rin-siyo/Hayashi Gahō, 1652], Nipon o daï itsi ran; ou, Annales des empereurs du Japon, tr. par M. Isaac Titsingh avec l'aide de plusieurs interprètes attachés au comptoir hollandais de Nangasaki; ouvrage re., complété et cor. sur l'original japonais-chinois, accompagné de notes et précédé d'un Aperçu d'histoire mythologique du Japon, par M. J. Klaproth. Paris: Oriental Translation Fund of Great Britain and Ireland. ...Click link for digitized, full-text copy of this book (in French)

External links

 Official Website 
 Area Tourism Organization
 Institute Chichibu tourism organizations
 The Hall of Curious Stones, a private museum in Chichibu]

Cities in Saitama Prefecture
Chichibu, Saitama
Chichibu District, Saitama